Tim Goodwin is an American politician serving as a member of the Iowa Senate from the 44th district. Elected in November 2020, he assumed office on January 11, 2021.

Early life and education 
Goodwin was born and raised in Burlington, Iowa. He earned a Bachelor of Arts degree in physical education and Master of Arts in sports management from Western Illinois University.

Career 
Goodwin began his career in public relations for the Boston Celtics and New York Knicks. He then became a school administrator and coach in Williamsburg, Iowa. He was also the director of administration and development for WW Transport, Inc., a trucking company based in West Burlington, Iowa. He was elected to the Iowa Senate in November 2020 and assumed office on January 11, 2021. He also serves as vice chair of the Senate Ways and Means Committee.

References 

Living people
People from Burlington, Iowa
Western Illinois University alumni
Republican Party Iowa state senators
Year of birth missing (living people)